Euploea stephensii is a butterfly in the family Nymphalidae. It was described by Cajetan Felder and Rudolf Felder in 1865. It is found in the Australasian realm.

Subspecies
E. s. stephensii (New Guinea)
E. s. pumila Butler, 1866 (New Guinea)
E. s. jamesi (Butler, [1877]) (Southeast New Guinea - Papua, Samarai, Tagula Island, Goodenough, Normanby, Fergusson Island)
E. s. kirschi (Moore, 1883) (Waigeu)
E. s. salpinxoides (Fruhstorfer, 1899) (West Irian, New Guinea, Manam Island)
E. s. bismarckiana (Fruhstorfer, 1900) (Umboi Island, New Britain, Duke of York Island, New Ireland, Queen Charlotte Island)
E. s. flaminia (Fruhstorfer, 1904) (Salawati)
E. s. phokion (Fruhstorfer, 1904) (East New Guinea, Huon Gulf, Karkar Island)
E. s. garcila Fruhstorfer, 1910 (West New Guinea: Sorong)
E. s. manusi Carpenter, 1942 (Admiralty Islands)
E. s. nivana Carpenter, 1953 (Nivani Islands)

References

External links
Euploea at Markku Savela's Lepidoptera and Some Other Life Forms

Euploea
Butterflies described in 1865
Butterflies of Oceania
Butterflies of Asia
Taxa named by Baron Cajetan von Felder
Taxa named by Rudolf Felder